Kimora: House of Fab is an American reality television series on the Style Network that debuted on January 23, 2013. Kimora: House of Fab chronicles the day-to-day life at JustFab, an online fashion website. Simmons was hired in 2011 after the company raised $33 million in first round capital. The series focuses solely on Simmons's career with the company, rather than her home life as shown in Kimora: Life in the Fab Lane.

Cast and characters

Main cast
 Kimora Lee Simmons - the President of Fab
 Adam Goldenberg and Don Ressler — the Big Bosses
 Lianca Lyons — the Kimora Whisperer
 Johnny Anastacio — the Drama King 
 Alyson Wilson — the Know-It-All
 Kimberly Tobman — the Perfectionist
 Lesley Holmes — the Trend Spotter

Recurring cast
 Sandra Diaz
 Sarah Marsh
 Rose Montoya
 Jessica Flores
 Ashley Hildebrandt
 Angela Fink

Episodes

Season 1 (2013)

References

External links
 JustFab Official Site

2010s American reality television series
2013 American television series debuts
2013 American television series endings
English-language television shows
Style Network original programming
Reality television spin-offs
American television spin-offs